Know Your Mushrooms is a 2008 documentary film by Canadian director Ron Mann.

The 74 minute Sphinx Productions film examines the counterculture Telluride Mushroom Festival, held annually in Telluride, Colorado and some of the mycologists and funghiphiles that gather there such as Larry Evans and Gary Lincoff, author of seven mushroom identification guidebooks, including the Audubon Field Guide to Mushrooms.

The soundtrack includes music by the Flaming Lips and The Sadies.

Know Your Mushrooms is more about hard science and gourmet cuisine than space-outs and the munchies.

Synopsis 
Director Ron Mann and his partners at the first Telluride Mushroom Festival in Colorado, collect and consume mushrooms of every variety, particularly the aesthetically unappealing. Mushroom fans and fungi experts explore and investigate during the four-day festival. Gary Lincoff and mycologist Larry Evans lead a wild mushroom hunt.
Day One: Displays of local mushrooms and cooking demonstrations.
Day Two: Discussion and lecture.
Day Three: Health effects of fungi and cultural roles. Discussion include mushroom's potential, for example, possible anti-cancer properties or mythological significance in shamanistic cultures. 
Day Four: A parade. Quizzes and short animations present controversial fungi, such as magic mushroom and fly agaric, the documentary provides an in-depth introduction to fungi.

Cast 
 Larry Evans as Larry Evans
 Gary Lincoff as Gary Lincoff
 Andrew Weil as Andrew Weil
 John Cage as John Cage
 Terence McKenna as Terence McKenna
 John Allegro as John Allegro

References

External links 
 

2008 films
Canadian documentary films
2008 documentary films
Documentary films about food and drink
2000s English-language films
2000s Canadian films